Taman Putra Perdana is a township in Dengkil sub-district, Sepang District, Selangor, Malaysia. Although the township's postcode is 47100 / 47120 / 47130, which gives it Puchong postal address, it is actually in the Sepang constituency of Selangor, administered by the Sepang Municipal Council (MPSepang). The township was developed by Kenshine Corporation in 1997.

List of residential areas 
Bandar Nusaputra (Presint 1-2)
Taman Amanputra
LBS Skylake Residence
D'Island
La Cottage
Siantan Apartment
Rista Villa Apartment
Kenanga Apartment
Rossana Villa Apartment
Teratai Apartment
Kiambang Apartment
Kekwa Apartment
Dahlia Apartment
Anggerik Apartment
Semarak Apartment
Seroja Apartment
Ruvena Villa Apartment
Alpha Arena Apartment
IT Admiral
IT Admiral 2
Elegan Residensi

Public schools
SK Taman Putra Perdana
SK Taman Putra Perdana (2)
SMK Putra Perdana
SRA Putra Perdana

Transport

Expressways/Highways/Roads
Taman Putra Perdana is accessible through these 6 main expressways and roads.

 North–South Expressway Central Link (ELITE) - towards Shah Alam, Bandar Saujana Putra, Kuala Lumpur International Airport and Nilai 
 South Klang Valley Expressway (SKVE) via Bandar Saujana Putra - towards Pulau Indah, Banting, Kuala Langat and Kajang
 Damansara–Puchong Expressway (LDP) via Jalan Puchong–Dengkil -  towards Putrajaya, Pusat Bandar Puchong, Bandar Kinrara, Bandar Sunway, Subang Jaya, Petaling Jaya, Damansara and Kepong
 Putrajaya Link - towards Cyberjaya and Putrajaya
 Maju Expressway - towards Seri Kembangan and Kuala Lumpur
 Jalan Puchong–Dengkil - towards Desa Ayer Hitam, Taman Meranti Jaya, Bandar Bukit Puchong, Taman Puchong Utama, Batu 14 Puchong and Bandar Puteri Puchong

Bus services
Causeway Link (also known as Handal Indah Sdn Bhd) bus 601 goes towards Pasar Seni, Kuala Lumpur via Puchong Utama, Batu 14 Puchong, Bandar Puteri Puchong, Tesco Puchong, IOI Puchong, Bandar Kinrara and Jalan Klang Lama (or Old Klang Road). This service was previously operated by RapidKL (until December 2015) and Metrobus (until October 2016).

Causeway Link bus 503 from Puchong Utama goes to Putrajaya Sentral via Cyberjaya. This route was previously operated by Nadi Putra until September 2017.

Another alternative is RapidKL bus 600 from Puchong Utama bus hub to Pasar Seni. Residents can connect this area through Jalan Puchong-Dengkil or Causeway Link routes 503 and 601.

Bus routes 
503:  Putrajaya Sentral - Taman Puchong Utama via Cyberjaya and Taman Putra Perdana (operated by Causeway Link / Handal Indah)
600: Puchong Utama bus hub - HAB Pasar Seni (alternative bus route accessible via Jalan Puchong-Dengkil or Causeway Link route 601; operated by RapidKL)
601: Taman Putra Perdana - HAB Pasar Seni via Puchong Utama, Batu 14 Puchong and Bandar Puteri Puchong (operated by Causeway Link / Handal Indah)

Light Rail Transit (LRT) and Mass Rapid Transit (MRT)
 Putra Heights LRT station and  Puchong Prima LRT station are the closest rail stations to Taman Putra Perdana by distance via North–South Expressway Central Link (ELITE) expressway and Jalan Puchong-Dengkil respectively. Currently, there are no feeder bus services to connect to these two stations.

 Pusat Bandar Puchong LRT station and  IOI Puchong Jaya LRT station are the only stations to serve to residents through Causeway Link bus 601.

The  16 Sierra station and  Cyberjaya North station of Klang Valley MRT Putrajaya Line will be located only 10 to 15 minutes away from the township. These stations are expected to complete and start operations in January 2023

References

Sepang District